Guru Guruswamy is an American engineer working as Principal Scientist at Ames Research Center since 1988.
He pioneered research in the area of computational aeroelasticity  that involves  Unsteady Aerodynamics, Finite Element Methods, Computational Fluid Dynamics, Parallel Computing and Problem Solving Environment. His innovative  research was utilized in the first commercial 3-D computational aeroelasticity software developed by a major aerospace industry. The aeroelasticity legend Holt Ashley extensively referred to Guruswamy's research in his classical review paper. In 1988 he demonstrated the unique use of Transonic Small Perturbation based CFD for  designing active controls to increase the safety of aircraft. It was followed by a break through development of Euler flow equations based  Computational Aeroelasticy. It was cited by another Aeroelasticity legend John Dugundji of MIT as an important milestone in Aeroelasticity.  A google search shows about 150 researchers took advantage Guruswamy's work based on the Euler equations for follow-up developments.

Personal 
As mentioned in the talk  during symposium at IISc he was born in Bangalore  and went to elementary school in a village Bidadi and middle school at SLN middle School  in Bengaluru downtown. Completed his high school at National High School, Basavanagudi, under graduate in civil engineering with first rank from  UVCE of Bangalore University and Masters in Structural Engineering with high distinction at IISc. He was the first under graduate degree holder in his family. Later obtained his PhD at Purdue in Aeronautical Engineering with 100% GPA.

Book chapters 
Guruswamy authored a chapter on software in the popular text book on finite element analysis by Prof Henry T. Yang Chancellor of UC Santa Barbara. Self content computer source codes provide systematic learning tool for students. It is used as a text book at many universities including Stanford. A summary of his research for the last four decades is archived in the second edition of a monumental Handbook by McGraw Hill publisher.  It is the second edition after 4 decades.

Software in Computational Aeroelasticity
Guruswamy single-handedly developed the first Euler Navier–Stokes equations-based aeroelastic code ENSAERO that received NASA Space Act Award. He led a team of 10 scientist to develop a three level parallel aeroelastic software HiMAP (High Fidelity Multidisciplinary Process) to model fluid/structures/controls interactions by using Euler Navier–Stokes flow equations coupled with modal/finite-element structural equations. HiMAP received NASA software release award.
Guruswamy's research 
helped to design one of the world's most sophisticated aircraft that was displayed at a air show in his home town Bangalore.

Parachute Research
Guruswamy has worked extensively  in the field parachute simulation and has developed first-of-its kind high fidelity time accurate methods. His work was related to Entry, Descent and Landing of Mars mission. Parachute was successfully used to land spacecraft on Mars.

Helicopter Research

Guruswamy introduced a time accurate simulation procedure for helicopter aeroelasticity based on the Navier-Stokes and finite-element equations, a break through improvement over  previously used quasi-steady hybrid loose coupling methods. His research makes possible to simulate gust related transient  conditions that may be faced by helicopters like Ingenuity (helicopter) in Mars atmosphere.

Air Taxis and Drones
Guruswamy has pioneered research in the area of stability analysis of Urban air mobility vehicle including drones by using the high fidelity aerodynamic modeling. Demonstrated results for take-off of a air taxi  and flutter of wing of an electric aircraft.

Plays
Guruswamy founded an amateur Kannada drama troupe 'Chitra-Vichitra' in 1984  in Silicon Valley He wrote and directed 5 dramas staged under the sponsorship of a cultural association Kannada Koota of Northern California KKNC He also played harmonium for drama.

References

Living people
Ames Research Center
20th-century American engineers
21st-century American engineers
Year of birth missing (living people)